Fire and Love is the second album of Christian metal band Guardian. It was released in 1991 and featured an arena rock sound, described by Cornerstone as "Bon Jovi to the bone".

This is the first album to feature Jamie Rowe on vocals and Karl Ney on drums.

Track listing
All songs written by David Bach, Tony Palacios, Jamie Rowe and John Elefante except where noted.
 "Power of Love" - 4:33
 "Send a Message" - 4:00
 "Time Stands Still" (Palacios) - 4:26
 "Forever and a Day" - 5:11
 "Takin' on the World" (Guardian, J. Elefante) - 3:52
 "Fire and Love" - 3:25
 "Turnaround" (Bach, Palacios, Rowe) - 4:18
 "Time and Time Again" - 4:52
 "The Rain" (Bach, Palacios, Rowe) - 5:31
 "Never Say Goodbye" - 5:06

Personnel 
Guardian
 Jamie Rowe – lead vocals, backing vocals 
 Tony Palacios – guitars, backing vocals
 David Bach – bass, backing vocals
 Karl Ney – drums

Additional musicians
 John Elefante – keyboards, backing vocals 
 Glen Hirami – accordion
 Ron Eglit – pedal steel guitar
 David Raven – drums 
 Dino Elefante – backing vocals

Production 
 John Elefante – producer, engineer 
 Dino Elefante – producer, engineer, mixing   
 MIke Mierau – engineer, mixing 
 Jeff Simmons – engineer 
 Gil Griffith – mix assistant 
 Terry DeGraff – art direction, design 
 Sandra Ney – cover consultant 
 Jeff Jones – photography 
 Recoeded and Mixed at Pakaderm Studios (Los Alamitos, California).
 Mastered at Precision Mastering (Hollywood, California).

References

Guardian (band) albums
1991 albums